Silvia Veloso (born October 18, 1998) is a Mozambican basketball player. She plays for the University of the Cumberlands Patriot and also the Mozambique women's national basketball team.

High school
Veloso played under Lionel Manhique in Mozambique. She averaged 16 points, 11 rebounds and 2 assists per game.

College
Veloso previously schooled at Seward County Community College. Played in 35 games with 32 starts averaging 22.7 minutes per game in her freshman year.

She moved to The University of Cumberlands and in her junior year. She played in 28 games while starting 25 and averaged 13.1 points, 87 assists.
As a senior she played in 20 games while starting 19. And also recorded 250 points, 131 rebounds, 71 steals and 67 assists.

National team career
Veloso has been part of Mozambique women basketball national team since a very young age where she played in the U-16 category during Africa U16 Championship for Women in 2013. She averaged 9.7 points, 5.3 rebounds and 2.7 assists.
She also participated in Afrobasket U18 Women in 2016, where she averaged 16.3 points, 4.5 rebounds and 2.7 assists.
Also in 2021 FIBA Women's AfroBasket, she averaged 2.4 points, O rebounds and O.4 assists.

References

Living people
1998 births
Mozambican women's basketball players